Barnsley Women's Football Club is an English Women's Football Club based in Barnsley, South Yorkshire, England. The Club currently plays in the FA Women's National League Division One North, which is in the Fourth Tier of Women's Football.

Barnsley Women's Football Club was formed in 1982, under the name ’Barnsley Ladies Football Club’. The club used the name ’Barnsley Ladies Football Club’ for 34 years until the end of the 2016/17 Season, when it changed its name to ’Barnsley FC Ladies’ for the following two seasons until the end of 2018/19. On 16 March 2018, Barnsley Women's Football Club Limited took over the club and changed its name to ’Barnsley Women’s Football Club’.

On Tuesday 14 May 2019 Barnsley Women won the County Cup by beating Huddersfield Town Ladies after extra time and penalties.

In 2019/20 Barnsley Women had their best ever FA Cup run when they reached the fourth round of the Women's FA Cup, losing 5 0 away to professional side Tottenham Hotspur Women in an exciting match on Sunday 26 January 2020.

On Sunday 27 November 2022, Barnsley Women played against Newcastle Women at St. James' Park in the 2nd Round of the Women's FA Cup in front of a crowd of 28,585. This was the largest attendance for a Women's FA Cup match, other than for Finals played at Wembley. Newcastle won a very close exciting fixture by 2 goals to 1.

The club's reserve team currently plays in the FA Women's National League Reserve Northern Division.

The club's junior teams play in the Sheffield & Hallamshire Women & Girls Leagues.

History

Season-by-season record

References

External links
Official site

Women's football clubs in England
Football clubs in South Yorkshire
Sheffield & Hallamshire County FA members